River Monsters is a British and American wildlife documentary television programme produced for Animal Planet by Icon Films of Bristol, United Kingdom. It is hosted by extreme angler and biologist Jeremy Wade, who travels around the globe in search of the most fearsome freshwater and saltwater killers, looking for clues, eyewitnesses, and stories about people who were dragged underwater by these vicious predators.  He tries to catch the biggest specimens and then release them back into the wild. His aim is to help people understand the truth behind the animals' attacks on humans to save these rare creatures from extinction.

River Monsters premiered on ITV in Great Britain, and became one of the most-watched, most successful programmes in Animal Planet's history, and one of the most-viewed series on Discovery Channel in the American market.

Overview 
River Monsters follows the worldwide adventures of Suffolk-born British host, biologist, adventurer and extreme angler Jeremy Wade. He explores rivers and lakes to uncover the creatures behind local folklore and harrowing tales of monster fish. The show has taken viewers to Cambodia, Canada, Germany, Spain, Italy, Scotland, Iceland, Norway, Argentina, Australia, New Zealand, Papua New Guinea, India, Japan, Russia, Suriname, Brazil, Guyana, Mexico, Peru, Ethiopia, Uganda, South Africa, the Republic of the Congo, Mongolia, and the U.S. states of Alaska, Florida, Missouri, Oklahoma, Texas, Oregon, Washington, and Vermont.

In the first season, Wade's weekly quest had him in search of piranha, goonch catfish (during his investigation of the Kali River goonch attacks), alligator gar, wels catfish, arapaima, piraíba, and the bull shark. All of them are potentially deadly creatures poorly understood by humans. The show also focuses on explaining the creatures' feeding habits, behaviour and conservation status. Rebroadcasts of the episodes with captions showing behind the scenes commentary from the host about the particular episode can also be seen on both Animal Planet and Discovery Channel. These episodes are going by the title River Monsters: Unhooked.

The second season of River Monsters began airing on 24 April 2010, although the first episode, titled "Demon Fish" first appeared on Discovery Channel on 28 March 2010. This season consisted of 7 episodes and took viewers to the River Congo and other distant locations. In the episode, "Death Ray", Wade caught a pregnant giant freshwater stingray, the largest fish he ever landed. She later gave birth to two pups while being examined by Wade and a team of biologists. This season featured the white sturgeon, Wade's second largest catch.

The ninth season of River Monsters was announced as the final season.

Episodes

Season 1 (2009)

Season 2 (2010)

Season 3 (2011)

Season 4 (2012)

Season 5 (2013)

Season 6 (2014)

Season 7 (2015)

Season 8 (2016) 
Promoted as a special season under the title River Monsters: Mysteries of the Ocean, this season sees Jeremy Wade shift his focus from freshwater to oceanic fish.

Season 9 (2017) 
This season was dubbed "the final season", as it is the last season of River Monsters.

Season 10 (2017) 
This season only had one episode, "Jeremy's Monster Story".

Additional episodes: The Lost Reels

Ratings 
River Monsters had the best series premiere in Animal Planet's network history by delivering 1.3 million viewers. It was also its most watched regularly airing primetime telecast in over six years. The second episode of Animal Planet's River Monsters delivered a 39% boost in total viewers (1.866 million) compared to the series premiere. Those numbers made it the best performing regularly scheduled primetime telecast in Animal Planet's history. The first season of River Monsters made it the best performing show in Animal Planet's history with every episode averaging over 1 million households. The season finale delivered about 1.47 million households.

The second season premiere episode became the network's best season premiere ever. It drew in 1.7 million total viewers.

See also
Jeremy Wade
Kali River goonch attacks
Fish Warrior

References

External links
 Official website
 Review of River Monsters, Leicester Mercury

Episode list using the default LineColor
Animal Planet original programming
2000s American documentary television series
2009 American television series debuts
2017 American television series endings
Nature educational television series
Fishing television series
2009 British television series debuts
2017 British television series endings